Douglas Gregory Brzezinski (born March 11, 1976) is a former American football offensive guard in the National Football League (NFL) for the Philadelphia Eagles and the Carolina Panthers. He played college football at Boston College and was drafted in the third round of the 1999 NFL Draft.

Brzezinski began his football career as an offensive lineman for Detroit Catholic Central High School, he has been inducted into Catholic Central’s athletic hall of fame for this.

References

1976 births
American football offensive guards
Boston College Eagles football players
Carolina Panthers players
Living people
Philadelphia Eagles players
Players of American football from Michigan
Sportspeople from Livonia, Michigan
Detroit Catholic Central High School alumni